Jeff Lander is an American video game programmer. He creates real-time 3D graphics at Darwin 3D, a game technology specialist company. He has written several articles on 3D graphics for Gamasutra and Game Developers Conference. In 2002, he received the IGDA Award for Community Contribution at the Game Developers Choice Awards.

Lander co-founded the Game Tech conference event with Chris Hecker, and, in 2004, co-designed it with Jonathan Blow.

In 2009, Jeff Lander and Bob Rafei founded Big Red Button Entertainment, a video game development studio. Lander is the studio's technical director, and served in this role for their debut game, Sonic Boom: Rise of Lyric.

Games

References

External links 
 

Living people
American video game directors
American video game programmers
Year of birth missing (living people)